Cardinal Gotti may refer to:
 Girolamo Maria Gotti (1834–1916)
 Vincenzo Ludovico Gotti (1664–1742)